Drakes Creek may refer to:

Drakes Creek, Arkansas, an unincorporated community
Drakes Creek (Arkansas), a stream in Arkansas
Drakes Creek (Barren River), a stream in Kentucky
Drakes Creek (East Fork Harveys Creek tributary), a stream in Pennsylvania